KWF may refer to:

Waterfall Seaplane Base, Alaska (by IATA and FAA airport code)
Killed while flying, see aviation accidents and incidents for related information
Korea Wrestling Federation, Korean United World Wrestling member
Kwara'ae language, by ISO 639-3 language code
Kwai Fong station, Hong Kong (by MTR station code)
Commission on the Filipino Language (Komisyon sa Wikang Filipino)